The Bell Bay Pulp Mill, also known as the Tamar Valley Pulp Mill or Gunns Pulp Mill, was a proposed $2.3 billion pulp mill in which the former Gunns Limited was planning to build in the Tamar Valley, near Launceston, Tasmania.

Gunns Limited went into voluntary administration in 2012, and on 30 August 2017, the permits for the proposed building lapsed, signalling the end of the project. A Gunns spokesperson said they will not contest the lapsing of the permits.

References

Pulp and paper mills
Buildings and structures in Launceston, Tasmania
Industrial buildings in Tasmania
Proposed buildings and structures in Australia
2017 disestablishments in Australia